Vauxhall station is a mainline and underground station in London.

Vauxhall station may also refer to:
 Duddeston railway station in Birmingham, England, previously known as "Vauxhall" and "Vauxhall and Duddeston"
 Great Yarmouth railway station in England, formerly known as "Great Yarmouth Vauxhall"